The 100 metres hurdles at the 2007 World Championships in Athletics was held at the Nagai Stadium in Osaka, Japan from August 27 to August 29.

Summary

Bursting from the blocks in the final, Susanna Kallur took a narrow lead over the first hurdle slightly ahead of defending champion Michelle Perry.  Over the next two hurdles, Kallur established a half metre gap on Perry, with returning silver medalist Delloreen Ennis-London almost matching Perry.  After the fifth hurdle, Ennis-London started to spend more time in the air over the hurdles, losing ground.  Virginia Powell and 2003 champion Perdita Felicien were gaining to award challenging Perry for second place.  After the sixth hurdle, Kallur's lead began to shrink.  By the ninth hurdle, the lead was gone, with Felicien holding a slight advantage over a wall of Powell, Perry, Kallur and Ennis-London.  Going in to the tenth hurdle, Powell and Ennis-London lost a little ground while Perry, Kallur and Felicien were virtually even coming off the final hurdle.  Two metres early, Perry began to lean, listing to her left  with arms stretched back as in aerodynamic ski jumping form.  She crossed the finish line a foot (30 cm) ahead of Felicien who was even less ahead of a virtual tie between Ennis-London and Kallur, with Ennis-London getting the nod for bronze.

Medalists

Schedule

Results

Heats
Qualification: First 3 in each heat (Q) and the next 4 fastest (q) advance to the semi-finals.

Semi-finals
Qualification: First 4 in each semi-final (Q) advance to the final.

Final
Wind: -0.1 m/s

External links
Results

Hurdles110 metres
Sprint hurdles at the World Athletics Championships
2007 in women's athletics